Nowdeh (also known as Nowdīyeh) is a village in Qaleh Shahin Rural District, in the Central District of Sarpol-e Zahab County, Kermanshah Province, Iran. At the 2006 census, its population was 263, in 60 families.

References 

Populated places in Sarpol-e Zahab County